The 2021 Outback Bowl was a college football bowl game played on January 2, 2021, with kickoff at 12:30 p.m. EST on ABC. It was the 35th edition of the Outback Bowl, and was one of the 2020–21 bowl games concluding the 2020 FBS football season. The game was named after its title sponsor, Outback Steakhouse.

Teams

The game matched the Indiana Hoosiers from the Big Ten Conference and the Ole Miss Rebels from the Southeastern Conference (SEC). This was the first meeting between the programs.

Ole Miss Rebels
 

 
Ole Miss entered the game with a 4–5 record in an SEC-only schedule. They finished in fifth place in the SEC's Western Division. The Rebels were 0–2 against ranked opponents, losing to eventual national champions Alabama and SEC Eastern Division champions Florida. They had wins against Kentucky, Vanderbilt, South Carolina and Mississippi State. This was Ole Miss's first appearance in the Outback Bowl. They were one of a limited number of teams to enter a bowl game with a losing record.

Indiana Hoosiers
 

 
Indiana entered the game with a 6–1 record in a Big Ten-only schedule. They finished in second place in the Big Ten's East Division. The Hoosiers were 3–1 against ranked opponents, defeating Penn State, Michigan, and Wisconsin while losing to Big Ten champions Ohio State. This was Indiana's first appearance in the Outback Bowl.

Game summary

Statistics

References

External links

Game statistics at statbroadcast.com

Outback Bowl
ReliaQuest Bowl
Outback Bowl
Outback Bowl
Indiana Hoosiers football bowl games
Ole Miss Rebels football bowl games